Her Secret is a 1933 American comedy drama film directed by Warren Millais and starring Sari Maritza, William Collier Jr. and Alan Mowbray.
It was released in the United Kingdom under the alternative title of The Girl from Georgia, and was based on a play by Maude Fulton.

Cast
 Sari Maritza as Waffles 
 William Collier Jr. as Johnny Norton
 Alan Mowbray as Nils Norton 
 Ivan F. Simpson as Lathrop 
 Monaei Lindley as Ermine, Johnny's Girlfriend 
 Rex Armond as Tex, Waffles' Friend 
 Jack Dewees as Kenneth 
 Barbara Luddy as Mae 
 Leila McIntyre as Dean of Women 
 John Hyams as Dean of Men 
 Grace Valentine as Mary 
 Mary Lee Manning as College Student 
 Bert James as College Boy 
 Barry Thompson as College Bad Boy

References

Bibliography

External links
 

1933 films
1933 comedy-drama films
American comedy-drama films
1930s English-language films
1930s American films